= January 1995 United Kingdom snowfall =

Weather event in northern England

Meteorological history
- Formed: 18 January 1995
- Dissipated: 28 January 1995

Blizzard
- Maximum snowfall or ice accretion: 40 cm (16 in) Leeds

Overall effects
- Fatalities: 6
- Areas affected: Northern England

A period of extremely heavy snowfall affected Northern England from 25 to 26 January 1995. The snow hit the major cities during the rush hour, earlier than expected, and brought chaos to the cities of Sheffield and Leeds, leaving thousands stranded overnight. Leeds received over 45 cm (18 in) of snow in just the first 3 hours of the storm.

== Impacts ==
The M62 became impassable on the night of 25 January, closing four hours after the blizzards began. Many motorists west of the road's summit spent the night at Birch service station, near Rochdale. Hundreds had to sleep in their vehicles, sustained by visits from police cars bearing gallons of soup. More than 3,000 vehicles were still stranded on the motorway by the morning of 26 January.

The Snake and Woodhead passes had been closed by dusk on 25 January in conditions described by South Yorkshire and Derbyshire police as 'atrocious'. Ice also became a dangerous hazard as temperatures plummeted below freezing. At Pendle, Lancashire, 22 children and three adults who had been at a ski school were brought to safety by a fell rescue team.

Public transport was also widely disrupted over the period and roads were chaotic, with five-hour journeys commonplace for commuters accustomed to a 30-minute drive. In the city centres of Barnsley, Bradford, Halifax, Huddersfield, Leeds and Sheffield endured protracted gridlocks as the blizzard arrived during rush hour. In Leeds, grit had been focused on the roads of the higher ground rather than in the city centre, leaving many motorists angry. In Sheffield, traffic was still trailing out of the city centre at 11pm.
